Johan Arend "Jos" Alberts (born 24 January 1960) is a Dutch cyclist. He competed in the men's team time trial event at the 1984 Summer Olympics, finishing in fourth place.

See also
 List of Dutch Olympic cyclists

References

1960 births
Living people
Dutch male cyclists
Olympic cyclists of the Netherlands
Cyclists at the 1984 Summer Olympics
People from Zutphen
Cyclists from Gelderland